Linares may refer to:

People
Fernando de Alencastre, 1st Duke of Linares (1641–1717), Spanish nobleman and military officer; viceroy of New Spain from 1711 to 1716
Andreu Linares (born 1975), Spanish futsal player
Art Linares, American politician from Connecticut
Arsenio Linares y Pombo (1848–1914), Spanish military officer and government official
Asunción Linares (1921–2005), Spanish paleontologist
Carmen Linares, stage name of Carmen Pacheco Rodríguez (born 1951). Spanish flamenco singer
Emilio Herrera Linares (1879–1967), Spanish military engineer; president of the Spanish government-in-exile from 1960 to 1962
Francisco Linares Alcántara (1825–1878), Venezuelan politician; president of Venezuela in 1877 and 1878
François de Linares (1897–1956), French general
Guillermo Linares (born 1951), U.S. politician from New York 
Jaime Miguel Linares (born 1982), Angolan footballer
Joan Linares (born 1975), Spanish futsal player 
Jorge Linares (born 1985), Venezuelan boxer 
José Antonio González Linares (born 1946), Spanish road cyclist
José María Linares (1808–1861), Bolivian politician; president of Bolivia, 1857–1861
Jose L. Linares (born 1953), U.S. federal judge
Julio Linares (1930–1993), Panamanian-U.S. jurist, politician, and historian
Luisa-Maria Linares (1915–1986), Spanish writer
Marta Linares (disambiguation), several people
Miguel Linares (born 1982), Spanish footballer
Olga F. Linares (born 1936), Panamanian–U.S. anthropologist and archaeologist
Omar Linares (born 1967), Cuban baseball player 
Pastor Linares (born 1971), Venezuelan road cyclist
Pedro Linares (1906–1992), Mexican artist
Roberto Linares (born 1986),  Cuban footballer
Fernando Borrego Linares, birth name of Polo Montañez (1955–2002), Cuban singer and songwriter
Rebeca Linares (born 1983), Spanish pornographic actress
Rodney Linares (born 1977), Dominican-American baseball coach
Rogelio Linares (1909–?), Cuban baseball player
Rufino Linares (1951–1998), Dominican MLB baseball player
Steven Linares, Gibraltarian teacher, trade unionist, barrister and politician

Places

Bolivia
José María Linares Province, Potosí Department

Chile
Linares, Chile, a city in the Maule Region
Linares Airport, a public use airport located near Linares, Chile
Estación Linares, a railway station in Linares, Chile
Linares Province, a province in the Maule Region

Colombia
Linares, Nariño, a city in the Nariño Department

Mexico
Linares, Nuevo León, a city in the state of Nuevo León

Spain
Linares, Jaén, a city in the province of Jaén, Andalusia
Linares (Allande), a parish in Allande, Asturias
 Linares (Proaza), a parish in Proaz, Asturias
 Linares (San Martín), a parish in San Martín del Rey Aurelio, Asturias
 Linares (Salas), a parish in Salas, Asturias
 Linares (Ribadesella), a parish in Ribadesella, Asturias
 Linares del Acebo, a parish in Cangas del Narcea, Asturias
Linares de Mora, a town in the province of Teruel, Aragón
Linares de Riofrío, a municipality in the province of Salamanca, Castile and León
Linares River, La Rioja, a river in La Rioja

Other uses
CD Linares, a football team in Linares, Jaén, Spain
Linares Deportivo, a football team in Linares, Jaén, Spain
Linares CF, a football club in Linares, Jaén, Spain
Deportes Linares, a football team in Linares, Chile
Linares International Chess Tournament, Linares, Jaén, Spain
Palace of Linares, Madrid, Spain

See also 
Diocese of Linares (disambiguation)